Japanese people in South Korea are people of Japanese ethnicity residing or living in South Korea. They are usually categorized into two categories: those who retain Japanese nationality and are present in South Korea (재한일본인, "Jaehan Ilbonin"), and those who changed their nationality to South Korean (일본계 한국인, "Ilbongye Hangugin").

History
The history of Japanese Koreans are usually divided into two different time periods.

Pre-colonial and colonial times (before 1945)
During Japanese rule in Korea, the peak of the Japanese population was 752,823, circa 1942.

Modern times (after 1945)

Notable people

Professors

 Hosaka Yuji (Originally from Tokyo, Japan)

Entertainers
 Ryohei Otani (Originally from Suita, Osaka, Japan)
 Sayuri Fujita (Originally from Shibuya-ku, Tokyo, Japan)

Singers
 Takuya Terada, former member of Cross Gene (Originally from Moriya, Ibaraki, Japan)
 Kangnam, former member of M.I.B. (Originally from Tokyo, Japan)
 Momo Hirai, Mina Myoui and Sana Minatozaki, members of Twice (Momo Hirai: Originally from Kyotanabe, Kyoto, Japan/Mina Myoui: Born in San Antonio, Texas, United States but raised in Nishinomiya, Hyōgo, Japan/Sana Minatozaki: Originally from Tennōji-ku, Osaka, Japan)
 Yuta Nakamoto and Shotaro Osaki, members of NCT (Yuta Nakamoto: Originally from Kadoma, Osaka, Japan/Shotaro Osaki: Originally from Zama, Kanagawa, Japan)
 Yuto Adachi, member of Pentagon (Originally from Nagano, Nagano, Japan)
 Nako Yabuki, and Hitomi Honda, former members of Iz*One (Nako Yabuki: Originally from Tokyo, Japan/Hitomi Honda: Originally from Tochigi, Japan)
 Sakura Miyawaki, member of Le Sserafim and former member of Iz*One (Originally from Kagoshima, Kagoshima, Japan)
 Nakamura Kazuha (Kazuha), member of Le Sserafim (Born in Kochi, Kochi, Japan but raised in Osaka, Japan)
 Miyu Takeuchi, former member of Japanese girl group AKB48 (Originally from Tokyo, Japan)
 Kwon Ri-se, former member of Ladies' Code (Originally from Fukushima, Japan)
 Kokoro Kato (Kokoro), Rise Katsuno (Remi), and Mao Hirokawa (May), members of Cherry Bullet (Kokoro Kato (Kokoro): Originally from Nagoya, Aichi, Japan/Rise Katsuno (Remi) and Mao Hirokawa (May): Originally from Tokyo, Japan)
 Juri Takahashi, member of Rocket Punch and former member of AKB48 (Originally from Kashima, Ibaraki, Japan)
 Kenta Takada, member of JBJ95 and former member of JBJ (Originally from Takasaki, Gunma, Japan)
 Yoshinori Kanemoto (Yoshi), Mashiho Takata, Asahi Hamada, and Haruto Watanabe, members of Treasure (Yoshinori Kanemoto (Yoshi): Originally from Kobe, Hyōgo, Japan/Mashiho Takata: Originally from Mie, Japan/Asahi Hamada: Originally from Osaka, Japan/Haruto Watanabe: Originally from Fukuoka, Japan)
 Sora Sakata, member of Woo!ah! (Originally from Fukuoka, Japan) 
 Riki Nishimura (Ni-ki), member of Enhypen (Originally from Okayama, Japan)
 Koyuki Mori (Yuki), member of Purple Kiss (Originally from Tokyo, Japan)
 Hina Nagai, member of Lightsum (Born in Kanagawa, Japan but raised in Tokyo, Japan)
 Sumire Aoyagi (Mire), member of Tri.be (Originally from Tokyo, Japan)
 Ogawa Mizuki (Léa), member of Secret Number (Originally from Tokyo, Japan)
 Terazono Keita, member of Ciipher (Originally from Osaka, Japan)
 Miyauchi Haruka (Miya), member of GWSN (Originally from Shizuoka, Japan)
 Amanuma Yuku, member of DKB (Originally from Saitama, Japan) 
 Mizuguchi Yuto (U), member of ONF (Originally from Osaka, Japan)
 Tokunaga Yuuri, member of Lunarsolar (Originally from Fukuoka, Japan)
 Haku Shota (Soul), member of P1Harmony (Originally from Saitama, Saitama, Japan)
 Hayase Leo, Nasukawa Shota (Zero), Imai Kairi and Udo Musashi (Kio),  members of T1419 (Hayase Leo, Nasukawa Shota (Zero) and Imai Kairi: Originally from Osaka, Japan/Udo Musashi (Kio): Originally from Kochi, Kochi, Japan)
 Rei Naoi, member of Ive (Originally from Anan, Tokushima, Japan)

Koreans of Japanese descent 
 Kiggen
 Keisuke Kunimoto (Originally from Yokohama, Kanagawa,  Japan)
 Lee Eun-ju (Originally from Shimonoseki, Yamaguchi, Japan)
 Shoo (Originally from Yokohama, Kanagawa,  Japan)
 Woo Jang-choon (Originally from Akasaka, Minato-ku, Tokyo, Japan)
 Crown Princess Yi Bangja (Originally from Tokyo, Japan)
 Prince Yi Gu (Originally from Tokyo, Japan)

Education
 Busan Japanese School
 Japanese School in Seoul

References

 
South Korea